Follow Your Star is a 1938 British musical film directed by Sinclair Hill and starring Arthur Tracy, Belle Chrystall and Mark Daly. It was made at Pinewood Studios.

Cast
 Arthur Tracy as Arthur Tee  
 Belle Chrystall as Mary  
 Mark Daly as Shorty  
 Horace Hodges as Mr. Wilmot  
 Nina Boucicault as Mrs. Tee  
 James Harcourt as Mr. Tee  
 Dick Tubb as Freddy 
 Finlay Currie as Maxie

References

Bibliography
 Low, Rachael. Filmmaking in 1930s Britain. George Allen & Unwin, 1985.
 Wood, Linda. British Films, 1927-1939. British Film Institute, 1986.

External links

1938 films
British musical films
British black-and-white films
1938 musical films
Films directed by Sinclair Hill
Films shot at Pinewood Studios
1930s English-language films
1930s British films